Chumani Pan (born 30 August 1985), is a South African actor. He is best known for the roles in the television serials such as; Ashes to Ashes, Montana,'woman king' and Shooting Stars.

Personal life
Chumani Pan was born on 30 August 1985 in Eastern Cape, in the Soto location in Mooiplaas, South Africa. He studied acting at City Varsity film and Multimedia School.

Career
In 2007, he made television debut with the role "Loop-en-val Radebe" in the e.tv drama series Shooting Stars and appeared in all three seasons of the show until 2010. Meanwhile, he made a cameo role in an episode of the SABC2 sitcom Stokvel in 2007. In 2012, he made the lead role "Malusi" in the SABC1 drama serial Montana. Then in 2010, he appeared in the kykNET sitcom Deeltitel Dames. In 2012, he reprised the role in second season as well. In the same year, he appeared in the Mzansi Magic telenovela iNkaba as the "Investigating Agent".

In 2013 he played a guest role in another kykNET period drama serial Donkerland. Then in 2014, he joined with the SABC1 youth drama serial Loxion Lyric. In 2015, he joined with the e.tv telenovela Ashes to Ashes and played the role as "Monwabisi Namane" in first two seasons. In 2016, he made a recurring role as "Mayenzeke" in the e.tv drama serial The Kingdom - uKhakhayi. In the following year, he played the role "Ntando" in the Mzansi Magic supernatural drama Igazi. Then he joined with the Mzansi Magic drama series Isithembiso to play the recurring role "Whitey".

In 2020, he appeared in three television serials: as "Jonas" in the soapie Generations, as "Luxolo Dladla" in the kykNET drama series Projek Dina, and then as "a doctor" in the SABC3 medical drama serial Vutha. Then in 2021, he joined with 1Magic drama Wounds with the role "Sonwabo Dube" and SABC2 telenovela Die Sentrum with the role "Muzi Gadluma". Apart from them, he made a guest role in an episode of the first season of SABC2 police procedural serial The Docket.

In 2015, he acted in the Ghanaian pan-African film Silver Rain with the role "Mark". For his role, he won the award for Best Supporting Actor at the 11th Africa Movie Academy Awards (AMAA) and nominated at the Eko International Film Festival. Apart from that, he also made supportive roles in the films such as Special Forces UK, Ella's Secret, I Now Pronounce You Black and White, End Game and Bakgat 3. Apart from cinema and television, he also made sporadic appearances in the theatre with the plays such as; Career Awareness and Destiny of Stone.

Filmography

References

External links
 IMDb

1985 births
Living people
South African male film actors
South African male television actors
South African male stage actors